St John's College is a state-integrated Catholic boys' secondary school in Hamilton, New Zealand, with a school roll of 816 as of March 2019. The school was established by the Marist Brothers in 1961 from Marist School (now Marian Catholic School). The school crest features the eagle of St. John the Apostle, with the motto "Caritas Christi Urget Nos" strewn across the bottom, a Latin motto translating loosely into "Christ's love urges us on". The mission statement for the school is "Preparing Young Men For Life".

History
St John's College moved to its current Hillcrest Road location in October 1962.

Facilities
A Pompallier technology centre was opened at St John's College in May 2002, which contains facilities for art, food technology, graphic design and materials technology classes. St John's College has an  Astroturf centre, named the Paul Honiss Tennis and Hockey Centre. It was completed in May 2003 on a budget of NZ$250,000.

A new Sports Centre at the school was opened in early 2020, with New Zealand Prime Minister, Jacinda Ardern attending to visit the opening. The gym is estimated to be worth NZ $ 8 million, with the same building also supporting three new classrooms. This newly established area began construction in 2018 as a response to the roll increase of students at St John's College. An updated facility was required for all students to sufficiently participate in sports activities at the school. Sports that can be played at the new gymnasium include basketball, volleyball, badminton and futsal.

Houses 
St John's College has four houses. The houses are named after four prominent figures in the Catholic Faith.
 Chanel – Red
 Marcellin – Blue
 Pompallier – Green
 Roncalli – Gold

Notable alumni

 Sosene Anesi – former rugby union footballer
 David Bennett – MP for Hamilton East
 James Gill - New Zealand Golf representative Eisenhower Trophy 2006, 2008
Mark van Gisbergen – England fullback
 Marty Holah – All Black Openside flanker
 Mike Homik – New Zealand Tall Black (2006), Silver medal at Commonwealth games in 2006
 Paul Honiss – rugby referee
 Benjamin Mitchell – Shortland Street actor
 Michael Redman – former Mayor of Hamilton, former CEO of the Hamilton City Council
 Bob Simcock – former MP for Hamilton West, former Mayor of Hamilton

See also
 List of schools in New Zealand

References

See also

External links
 

Boys' schools in New Zealand
Educational institutions established in 1923
Secondary schools in Hamilton, New Zealand
Catholic secondary schools in Hamilton, New Zealand
Marist Brothers schools
1923 establishments in New Zealand